Louis Emanuel Martin Jr. (November 18, 1912 – January 27, 1997) was an American journalist, newspaper publisher, civil rights activist and advisor to three Presidents of the United States. Through his political activism during the civil rights era, he came to be known as the "Godfather of Black Politics."

Early life
Born in Shelbyville, Tennessee, to Dr. Louis E. Martin Sr. and Willa Martin, Louis Jr. grew up in Savannah, Georgia. His father, a physician of Afro-Cuban ancestry, was a graduate of Meharry Medical College in Nashville, Tennessee. It was there that he met and married the former Willa Hill of nearby Shelbyville. Louis Jr. was their only son.

Dr. Martin moved his family to Savannah when Louis Jr. was four years old, largely because the climate of southeast Georgia reminded him of the sub-tropical climate of his native Santiago, Cuba. It was in Savannah that Louis Jr. later met and married the former Gertrude Scott, a Phi Beta Kappa graduate of Ohio State University. They have five children.

Newspaper career
After first attending Fisk University, Martin went on to graduate from the University of Michigan in 1934, where he earned a Bachelor of Arts degree in journalism. Following college, Martin traveled to his father's native Cuba, spending two years there as a freelance writer based in Havana. Returning to the United States in 1936, he was hired as a reporter with the Chicago Defender, a major black newspaper published in Chicago, Illinois.

After just six months in Chicago he was asked to return to Michigan to help launch a new black newspaper, the Michigan Chronicle, serving as its first editor and publisher. Martin remained at the Chronicle for eleven years.

Louis Martin was a founder of the National Newspaper Publishers Association, a group of black newspaper publishers. He was also (in 1970) a founder of the Joint Center for Political and Economic Studies, a research organization in Washington, D.C. providing technical support for black officeholders and scholars  throughout the country; serving as its first chairman for eight years.

Political career
Originally recruited by R. Sargent Shriver, Martin joined the 1960 Presidential campaign of Senator John F. Kennedy. During the campaign, Martin was instrumental in persuading candidate Kennedy to place a telephone call to Coretta Scott King to express dismay over the jailing of her husband, the Rev. Dr. Martin Luther King Jr. That phone call was widely credited with helping Kennedy win a major portion of the black vote in the general election that year. It prompted Dr. King's father, the Reverend Martin Luther King Sr., a registered Republican, to vote for Democratic Presidential candidate Kennedy.

Following the assassination of President Kennedy in 1963, Martin was  among the few close Kennedy advisors to successfully make the transition to the new administration of President Lyndon B. Johnson. In 1967, as a trusted advisor, Martin was influential in President Johnson's decision to nominate Thurgood Marshall as the first black Justice of the United States Supreme Court.  Of his close working relationship with Johnson it was said that They talked to each other in the shorthand of experienced political pros, according to Clifford Alexander, Special White House counsel and the first African-American Secretary of the United States Army. Secretary Alexander regarded Martin as his mentor. Among the other leading black public figures whom Martin helped raise to prominence was Vernon E. Jordan Jr., later a close adviser to President Bill Clinton. Martin helped recruit Jordan to head the National Urban League.

Eddie Williams, president of the Joint Center for Political and Economic Studies said it was surprising that Martin was largely unknown to the public at large, given his wide-ranging influence in the White House and his role in the development of black political power in the Democratic Party. "One reason for this is that in Washington, he was the consummate political insider," Williams said. "He traversed the corridors of power for many years without calling attention to himself and his achievements." According to Williams, it was in the Washington Post that Martin was first called the "Godfather of Black politics".

On Monday, January 27, 1997, Martin died in Orange, California. He was 84.

Personal life 
Martin was a Catholic, a member of Little Flower Catholic Church in Bethesda, Maryland.

Career timeline
Michigan Chronicle, editor and publisher, 1936–47
Chicago Defender, editor-in-chief, 1947–59, editor, 1969–78, columnist, 1987–97
Democratic National Committee, deputy chairman, 1960–69
Political advisor to President John F. Kennedy, 1960–63
Political advisor to President Lyndon B. Johnson, 1963–68
Special assistant to President Jimmy Carter, 1978–81
Assistant vice president of communications, Howard University, 1981–87
Chairman of the board, Calmar Communications, 1981–97

Honors

Awards 
National Urban League, Equal Opportunity Award, 1979
National Newspaper Publishers Association, John B. Russwurm Award, 1980
Howard University, Communications Award, 1987
Democratic Party, Larry O'Brien Achievement Award, 1992

Honorary degrees
Wilberforce University, 1951
Harvard, 1970
Howard University, 1979
Wesleyan University, 1980

Notes

 In author Alex Poinsett's book Walking with Presidents Louis Martin recounts his first awareness of race and its peculiar significance in American society. His father was napping in a back room of his office when the receptionist rushed in excitedly saying: "You've got to get up. It's a white man!" Jolted awake, Dr. Martin rushed to the front waiting-room. Here, Martin reflects on this event that occurred in 1919 when he was seven years old: "I always regretted that my old man got up. It struck me that just being a white man made a hell of a lot of difference. It impressed me so much that I became a civil rights advocate at the age of seven. From that time forward, I kept looking for signs and studying people closely as I began to understand how crazy this society is."
 In the foreword to Poinsett's biography of Louis Martin, Vernon Jordan wrote: "…a testimony to the enthusiasm, wisdom, and optimism with which Louis Martin approached politics.  For more than half a century he was an indefatigable participant in America's political affairs.  After helping FDR with reelection in 1944, he went on to serve as advisor and assistant to Presidents Kennedy, Johnson and Carter, and along the way initiated generations of black people into the leadership ranks of the American political system. For me he not only was a teacher and a mentor but remained a steadfast friend and a constant source of inspiration. Louis was always immensely generous with his time, and I - like so many others - knew that I could call him anytime and hear that familiar greeting, 'What's up?' by which he meant 'fill me in and let's see what needs to be done'."

References

Lewis, Neil A., Louis E. Martin, 84, Aide To 3 Democratic Presidents - New York Times, January 30, 1997

External links
Oral History Interviews with Louis Martin, from the Lyndon Baines Johnson Library

Further reading
Poinsett, Alex  Walking With Presidents: Louis Martin and the Rise of Black Political Power. Joint Center for Political and Economic Studies, Madison Books, Lanham, Maryland, 1997
Height, Dorothy Open Wide The Freedom Gates, Public Affairs, New York, N.Y., Perseus Books Group, 2003

Fisk University alumni
American newspaper founders
University of Michigan College of Literature, Science, and the Arts alumni
American people of Cuban descent
African-American people
Wesleyan University people
American civil rights activists
1912 births
1997 deaths
People from Shelbyville, Tennessee
20th-century American writers
African-American Catholics
20th-century African-American writers
Roman Catholic activists